Philip W. Johnston (July 21, 1944 in Chelsea, Massachusetts) is an American businessman, politician and former Secretary of Human Services in Massachusetts and Regional Administrator of Health and Human Services for New England.

Johnston received a Bachelor of Arts degree from the University of Massachusetts Amherst and a Master of Arts degree from the John F. Kennedy School of Government at Harvard University.

In 1996, Johnston founded and is president of Johnston Associates, a communications and public affairs consulting firm. He is Chair of the Board of the Blue Cross and Blue Shield of Massachusetts Foundation, the Massachusetts Health Policy Forum, and the Robert F. Kennedy Center for Justice and Human Rights. He also sits on the Boards of the University of Massachusetts, the Kenneth B. Schwartz Center, the Robert F. Kennedy Children's Action Corps, the Massachusetts Medicaid Policy Institute, the Roosevelt Institute, and Stop Handgun Violence.

He was elected to the state legislature five times. From 1984 to 1991, he was Secretary of Human Services in the Commonwealth of Massachusetts under Governor Michael Dukakis. He was also executive director of the Robert F. Kennedy Memorial Center for Human Rights in Washington, D.C. In 1992, he was appointed by U.S. President Bill Clinton as the New England Director for the U.S. Department of Health and Human Services, where he served until 1996. Johnston was twice elected chair of the Massachusetts Democratic Party, in 2000 and 2004.

1996 Congressional election
In 1996, Johnston was a Democratic candidate for Congress in the 10th District of Massachusetts. Johnston was initially declared the winner, and an official recount in several contested towns preserved Johnston's victory, though by a narrower margin. Following the recount, Bill Delahunt sought judicial review in the Massachusetts Superior Court. Judge Elizabeth Donovan conducted a de novo review of the contested ballots and declared Delahunt the victor by a 108-vote margin. The case was appealed to the Massachusetts Supreme Judicial Court, which upheld the lower court ruling. The case is also noteworthy for the issue of "hanging chads" in punch-card voting machines, and was later referenced as a precedent by the Florida Supreme Court in Gore v. Harris during the 2000 United States presidential election recount in Florida.

References

External links
Johnston Associates website

1944 births
Living people
Harvard Kennedy School alumni
Massachusetts Democratic Party chairs
Massachusetts Democrats
Politicians from Chelsea, Massachusetts
People from Marshfield, Massachusetts
Massachusetts Secretaries of Health and Human Services
University of Massachusetts Amherst alumni